Barry W. Blaustein is an American comedy writer best known for his writing on Saturday Night Live and What's Alan Watching? and the screenplays for Coming to America, Coming 2 America and The Nutty Professor all written in collaboration with David Sheffield.

Blaustein directed, wrote, produced, and narrated the wrestling documentary Beyond the Mat.

Filmography

Writing credits
Saturday Night Live (1980–1983) (TV)
Police Academy 2: Their First Assignment (1985)
Coming to America (1988)
What's Alan Watching? (1989) (TV)
Boomerang (1992)
The Nutty Professor (with Tom Shadyac and Steve Oedekerk) (1996)
Nutty Professor II: The Klumps (2000)
The Honeymooners (2005)
Coming 2 America (2021)

Directing credits
Beyond the Mat (1999)
The Ringer (2005)
 Guys N' Divas: Battle of the Highschool Musicals (2009)
Peep World (2010)

References

External links

American male screenwriters
Living people
Year of birth missing (living people)